Frog Eye is an unincorporated community in Tallapoosa County, Alabama, United States.

Frog Eye has been noted for its unusual place name.

References

Unincorporated communities in Tallapoosa County, Alabama
Unincorporated communities in Alabama